Newfie (also Newf or sometimes Newfy) is a colloquial term used by Canadians for someone who is from Newfoundland. Some Newfoundlanders consider "Newfie" as a slur used by American and Canadian military forces stationed on the island. The term also has its use in mid-to-late 20th century Newfie jokes that depicted "Newfies" as foolish, in particular when told in Canadian French, leading to the derogatory nature of the term. 

During the Second World War, sailors on convoy duty nicknamed St. John's Newfiejohn.

Usage
The first edition of the Gage Canadian Dictionary, published in 1983, and the second edition of the Random House Unabridged Dictionary, published in 1987, both include usage notes describing the term 'Newfie' as offensive.  However, neither the second edition of the Canadian Oxford Dictionary, published in 2004, nor the current edition of the Dictionary of Newfoundland English, published in 1998, make such a mention.
  
In March 2006, an Edmonton police officer was disciplined for using the word Newphie to describe the apprehension of an individual under the Mental Health Act.

See also
 Newfie Bullet, an ironic nickname created by U.S. military personnel serving at bases in Newfoundland during the Second World War for a notoriously slow passenger train operated on the island.
 Newfie Screech, a type of rum bottled in Newfoundland.

References

External links
 Awareness/Education: Implications of the use of the word 'Newfie'
 Discussion on Implications of the word 'Newfie'
 Newfoundland sayings and expressions
 HomeSickNewfies
 A comedy podcast discussing 'Newfie' with a Newfoundlander
 From Newfoundland to UpAlong.org

Regional nicknames
Pejorative demonyms
Canadian English